Shravasti Airport is an upcoming domestic airport, which will serve the city of Shravasti, Uttar Pradesh, India. It is near an important Buddhist pilgrimage site, where Lord Buddha is believed to have spent 24 monsoons in this city. Numerous stupas, monasteries and several temples near the archaeological site of Sahet-Mahet establish Buddha's association with Shravasti. The airport is being developed by upgrading the existing airfield, which was used only by Government and VIPs, in three phases. It covers an area of 57 acres, and has a terminal building, an Air Traffic Control (ATC) tower, an apron for parking of two 19-seater Dornier 228 aircraft, a fire station and a runway. The first phase is almost completed, and will open in the first quarter of 2023. In the second and third phase, the airport will expanded to an area of 750 acres. Under the UDAN scheme, flights from Shravasti to Lucknow, Varanasi, Prayagraj and Kanpur will be started after the airport becomes operational.

References

Airports in Uttar Pradesh
Proposed airports in Uttar Pradesh
Shravasti district
Shravasti